Have You Never Been Mellow is the fifth studio album by British-Australian singer Olivia Newton-John, released on 12 February 1975 by MCA Records.

Reception

Both the title single and the album rose to the top of their respective US charts (the Billboard Hot 100 singles chart and the Billboard 200 albums chart). The title song and its follow-up, "Please Mr. Please", were both top 10 on three Billboard charts: the Hot 100, Adult Contemporary, and Country.
The title song was Newton-John's first charting single in Japan, where it reached number 26 on the Oricon singles chart. Newton-John received a Grammy nomination for Best Female Pop Vocal Performance for her work on the song "Have You Never Been Mellow", but lost to "At Seventeen" by Janis Ian. The album was also named Favorite Pop/Rock Album at the American Music Awards of 1976, beating The Eagles and Elton John.

The album was certified Gold in the US. The LP sold 169,380 in Japan.

Track listings

Charts

Weekly charts

Year-end charts

Certifications and sales

References

1975 albums
Olivia Newton-John albums
Albums produced by John Farrar
MCA Records albums
EMI Records albums